Bennington, Vermont is a town in the United States.

Bennington may also refer to:

Places

Canada 
 Bennington, Ontario, a community in the township of Zorra

United States 
 Bennington, Idaho
 Bennington, Illinois
 Bennington, Indiana
 Bennington, Kansas
 Bennington, Nebraska
 Bennington, New Hampshire, a New England town
 Bennington (CDP), New Hampshire, the main village in the town
 Bennington, New York
 Bennington, Oklahoma
 Bennington (CDP), Vermont, an urbanized area within the town of Bennington
 Bennington County, Vermont

Other uses
 Bennington (surname)
 Battle of Bennington, near Bennington, Vermont
 Bennington College, located in the town of Bennington, Vermont
 Bennington Triangle, an alleged paranormal zone in Vermont
 USS Bennington, two ships
 Bennington, a type of salt-glazed fired clay toy marble
 Bennington (radio show), a radio show on SiriusXM

See also
 Bennington Township (disambiguation)
 Benington (disambiguation)
 Binnington (disambiguation)
 North Bennington, Vermont
 Old Bennington, Vermont
 Long Bennington, Lincolnshire, England
 Pennington (disambiguation)